Herklotsichthys is a genus of herrings in the family Clupeidae found mostly around Southeast Asia and Australia with one species each in the Persian Gulf, the Red Sea, and the western Indian Ocean. This genus currently contains 12 species.

Species
 Herklotsichthys blackburni (Whitley, 1948) (Blackburn's herring)
 Herklotsichthys castelnaui (J. D. Ogilby, 1897) (Castelnau's herring)
 Herklotsichthys collettei Wongratana, 1987 (Collette's herring)
 Herklotsichthys dispilonotus (Bleeker, 1852) (Blacksaddle herring)
 Herklotsichthys gotoi Wongratana, 1983 (Goto's herring)
 Herklotsichthys koningsbergeri (M. C. W. Weber & de Beaufort, 1912) (Koningsberger's herring)
 Herklotsichthys lippa (Whitley, 1931) (Australian spotted herring)
 Herklotsichthys lossei Wongratana, 1983 (Gulf herring)
 Herklotsichthys ovalis (Anonymous referred to E. T. Bennett, 1830)
 Herklotsichthys punctatus (Rüppell, 1837) (Spotback herring)
 Herklotsichthys quadrimaculatus (Rüppell, 1837) (Bluestripe herring)
 Herklotsichthys spilurus (Guichenot, 1863) (Reunion herring)

References

 

Clupeidae
Marine fish genera
Taxa named by Gilbert Percy Whitley